Božana Butigan (born 19 September 2000) is a Croatian volleyball player. She plays as middle blocker for Italian club Volley Bergamo.

International career 
She is a member of the Croatia women's national volleyball team. She competed at the 2017 FIVB Volleyball World Grand Prix, 2018 Mediterranean Games,  2019 Women's European Volleyball League, and 2021 Women's European Volleyball League, winning a silver medal.

Awards

Club
Imoco Volley Conegliano
 Italian League: 2021
 Italian Cup: 2021, 2022
 Italian Supercup: 2020, 2021
 CEV Champions League: 2021

References

External links
Božana Butigan at CEV.eu

2000 births
Living people
Croatian women's volleyball players
Sportspeople from Mostar
Mediterranean Games medalists in volleyball
Mediterranean Games gold medalists for Croatia
Competitors at the 2018 Mediterranean Games
Expatriate volleyball players in Italy
21st-century Croatian women